W50 may refer to:
W50 (nuclear warhead), a nuclear weapon
Westerhout 50, an interstellar cloud
IFA W50, a truck built in East Germany

In athletics:
 Masters athletics, an age group for athletes aged 35+